Tecollotzin was a Tlatoque (ruler) of Coyoacán altepetl in 15th century Mexico.

Family 
He was a son of the Maxtla, the ruler of Coyoacán, and grandson of ruler Tezozomoc and Tzihuacxochitzin I.

His aunt was Ayauhcihuatl (Aztec "empress") and his uncle was Quaquapitzahuac.

Upon Tezozomoc's death in the year Twelve Rabbit (1426), his son Tayatzin became a king, but Maxtla seized power at Azcapotzalco, leaving the rulership of Coyoacán to Tecollotzin.

Family pole

Notes

Aztec nobility
Tlatoque
Coyoacán
15th-century monarchs in North America
15th-century indigenous people of the Americas
Nobility of the Americas